In Ireland, the June Holiday (sometimes called the June Bank Holiday) is observed on the first Monday of June. It was previously observed as Whit Monday until 1973.

See also
Bank holiday

References

Public holidays in the Republic of Ireland
Monday observances
June observances
Holidays and observances by scheduling (nth weekday of the month)